No Safety is an American rap album by Tiny Doo.

Controversy
No Safety became the subject of controversy after authorities in San Diego charged Doo with promoting violence in the album's lyrics in 2014.

References

Tiny Doo albums
2014 debut albums